DR P5 is one of DR's digital radio stations in Denmark. It launched on 2 November 2009, replacing the former P4 Danmark.
P5 is aimed at people over the age of 60.

Presenters 
 Anders Bisgaard
 Charlotte Mørck
 Connie Warnick Aagaard
 Gert Eilrich
 Hans Otto Bisgaard
 Jesper Maigaard
 Jørgen Bøgen
 Jørgen de Mylius
 Karlo Staunskær
 Leif Wivelsted
 Margaret Lindhardt
 Monica Krog-Meyer
 Nis Boesdal
 Peter Sten
 Poul Erik Sørensen
 Søren Dahl

Notes

Radio stations in Denmark
Radio stations established in 2009